The 43rd Regiment Massachusetts Volunteer Infantry was a regiment of infantry that served in the Union Army during the American Civil War. The unit was first formed in September 1862 in response to President Abraham Lincoln's call for 300,000 men to serve for nine months. The nucleus of the regiment was the Second Battalion Massachusetts Volunteer Militia, a unit dating to 1798 known as the Boston Light Infantry and nicknamed the "Tigers." The 43rd Massachusetts therefore became known as the "Tiger Regiment."

The regiment trained at Camp Meigs in Readville, Massachusetts just outside of Boston. They departed Massachusetts on October 24, assigned to Maj. Gen. John G. Foster's Department of North Carolina, later designated as the XVIII Corps. The regiment was stationed in New Bern, North Carolina. In December, the regiment took part in the Goldsboro Expedition. The objective of this maneuver was to disrupt the Confederate supply line along the Wilmington and Weldon Railroad by destroying the Goldsboro Bridge. During this expedition, was lightly engaged in the Battles of Kinston, White Hall and Goldsboro Bridge.

While based in New Bern, the 43rd Massachusetts participated in patrols and reconnaissance expeditions. The unit returned to Boston in July 1863 and was mustered out on July 30, 1863. The regiment lost two men killed in action and 12 by disease.

See also 
 Massachusetts in the Civil War
 List of Massachusetts Civil War units

Notes

References

External links
43rd Massachusetts Infantry in square formation in New Bern, N.C., March 12, 1863
Civil War Index: 43rd Massachusetts Infantry in the Civil War

Units and formations of the Union Army from Massachusetts
Military units and formations established in 1862
Military units and formations disestablished in 1863